9-1-1: Lone Star is an American procedural drama television series focusing on the fire, police, and ambulance departments of the fictional company 126, located in Austin, Texas. The use of "Lone Star" in the name associates it with Texas, the "Lone Star State". It was created for Fox by Ryan Murphy, Brad Falchuk, and Tim Minear. The series is a spin-off of the television series 9-1-1, and was ordered by Fox in May 2019. It premiered on January 19, 2020.

Fox renewed the show for a second season in April 2020, and it debuted on January 18, 2021. In May 2021, the series was renewed for a third season, which premiered on January 3, 2022. In May 2022, the series was renewed for a fourth season, which premiered on January 24, 2023.

Premise
From 9-1-1 co-creators Ryan Murphy, Brad Falchuk and Tim Minear, 9-1-1: Lone Star follows a sophisticated New York firefighter who, along with his son, relocates from Manhattan, New York to Austin, Texas. He must try to balance the duties of saving those who are at their most vulnerable and solving the problems in his own life. He is joined by other firefighters as well as members of the police department and emergency medical services. Series star Rob Lowe serves as co-executive producer.

Cast

Main
 Rob Lowe as Owen Strand, firefighter captain from New York City and TK's father. He was diagnosed with lung cancer as a result of being a first responder to the September 11 attacks, in which he also lost his entire firehouse. Having rebuilt his team in New York, he was asked to do the same for the 126 in Austin. 
 Liv Tyler as Michelle Blake (season 1): the paramedic Emergency Medical Services (EMS) captain. She is also trying to locate her sister Iris, who has been missing for three years. It is revealed in the second season that she left the 126 to help homeless people with mental illness like her sister.
 Ronen Rubinstein as Tyler Kennedy "TK" Strand, a firefighter with the 126. He is a recovering opioid addict and Captain Owen's son. TK overdosed just prior to his arrival in Austin. He starts a relationship with police officer Carlos Reyes. In season 2, he quit being a firefighter and became a paramedic. 
 Sierra McClain as Grace Ryder, a 9-1-1 operator and Judd's wife.
 Jim Parrack as Judson "Judd" Ryder, firefighter and Grace's husband. Judd is the sole survivor of 126's previous team's fire disaster. 
 Natacha Karam as Marjan Marwani, a firefighter and paramedic. Marjan is an adrenaline junkie, a devout Muslim, and an Instagram celebrity.
 Brian Michael Smith as Paul Strickland, a firefighter and paramedic with a keen eye for details. Paul is also a trans man.
 Rafael L. Silva as Carlos Reyes, a police officer with the Austin Police Department, who begins a romantic relationship with TK.
 Julian Works as Mateo Chavez. He is severely dyslexic, and is a DREAM-er who must keep his job or be deported.
 Gina Torres as Tommy Vega (season 2–present): an EMS replacement captain. Tommy, mother of twin daughters, re-entered the workforce after eight years, to support her family when COVID-19 caused her husband's restaurant to close.
 Brianna Baker as Nancy Gillian (recurring, seasons 1–2; season 3–present): A paramedic who is a member of the Rescue 126 EMS crew.
 Kelsey Yates as Isabella "Izzy" Vega (guest, season 2; season 3–present): Tommy's daughter and Evie's twin sister.
 Skyler Yates as Evie Vega (guest, season 2; season 3–present): Tommy's daughter and Izzy's twin sister.

Recurring
 Kyle Secor as Deputy Fire Chief Alden Radford (season 1; guest, season 2): A fire chief who convinces Owen to come to Austin to rebuild Station 126.
 Mark Elias as Tim Rosewater (seasons 1–2): A paramedic who is also a member of Rescue 126 EMS crew. He dies while on a call.
 Jon Foster as Dustin Shepard (season 1): An ex-boyfriend of Michelle Blake's missing sister, Iris, who Michelle believes is connected to Iris's disappearance.
 Brett Rice as Wayne Gettinger (season 1): An elderly man who is receiving chemotherapy treatments at the same time as Owen. He also offers Owen advice on how to deal with his cancer.
 Mary Kay Place as Theresa Blake (season 1): Michelle's mother who wants Michelle to move on from what happened to Iris, Theresa's younger daughter who went missing. 
 Natalie Zea as Zoe (season 1): A psychology professor at the University of Texas at Austin. She meets Owen at a beauty supply store and later begins dating him.
 Billy Burke as Captain Billy Tyson (seasons 1 and 3; guest, season 2): A former firefighter for the 126 who also has cancer.
 Tamala Jones as Det. Sarina Washington (season 1; guest, season 3): A detective with the Austin Police Department.
 Lyndsy Fonseca as Iris Blake (seasons 1 and 4): Michelle's missing sister.
 Lisa Edelstein as Gwyneth "Gwyn" Morgan (seasons 2–3): Owen's ex-wife and TK's mother, who arrives in Austin after her son's hospitalization.
 Derek Webster as Charles Vega (season 2): Tommy's husband.
 Lexi Crouch as Isabella "Izzy" Vega (season 2): Tommy's and Charles' daughter and Evie's twin sister.
 Xandi Crouch as Evie Vega (season 2): Tommy's and Charles' daughter and Izzy's twin sister.
 Benito Martinez as Gabriel Reyes (season 2; guest, seasons 3-4): Carlos' father, a Texas Ranger.
 Todd Stashwick as Dennis Raymond (season 2): An arson investigator who is later revealed to be a serial arsonist himself.
 Jack Conley as Captain Tatum (guest, season 2; season 3): Captain at station 129.
 Julie Benz as Sadie Becker (season 3): A woman who rents the cabin next to Owen's.
 Carly Dutcher as Lindsey Robertson (season 3): A teenage woman Paul saves.
 Jackson Pace as Wyatt Harris (season 3): Judd's son he had through a one-night stand 17 years earlier. 
 Amy Acker as Catherine Harper (season 3): Chief of staff for the governor of Texas. Catherine and Owen meet through an exclusive dating app.
 Robyn Lively as Marlene Harris (season 3): The mother of Judd's son, Wyatt. 
 Nathan Owens as Julius Vega (season 3): Charles' brother and Tommy's brother-in-law.
 Neal McDonough as Sgt. Ty O'Brien (guest, season 3; season 4): A hard-assed police sergeant who is known for both his by the book approach and his dislike of firefighters.
 Amanda Schull as Special Agent Rose Casey (season 4): An FBI agent investigating members of an extremist group, with Owen's help.

Guest
 Alex Carter as Captain (season 1): The former captain of the 126 who is killed in the explosion. 
 Jesse Luken as Jake Harkes (season 1): One of the former members of the 126 who is killed in the explosion.
 Matt McTighe as Chuck Parkland (season 1): One of the former members of the 126 who is killed in the explosion.
 Graham Shiels as Cory Garrity (season 1): One of the former members of the 126 who is killed in the explosion.
 Angel Parker as Josie (season 1): A woman who Paul meets on a call. They date briefly, until she learns he is trans.
 Barry Corbin as Stuart Ryder (seasons 1–3): Judd Ryder's father.
 Mena Massoud as Salim (season 2): Marjan's childhood friend whom she has been arranged to be married since they were twelve.
 William Allen Young as Benjamin Williams (season 2): Grace's father.
 Bart Johnson as Stanley (season 3): Marlene's fiancé and Wyatt's future stepfather.
 D. B. Woodside as Trevor Parks (season 4): A father and preacher brought to Texas, but caught in a dangerous storm.

Crossover cast
Regular cast members of the original 9-1-1:
 Aisha Hinds as Henrietta "Hen" Wilson (special guest, season 2): L.A. firefighter and paramedic.
 Ryan Guzman as Edmundo "Eddie" Díaz (special guest, season 2): L.A. firefighter.
 Oliver Stark as Evan "Buck" Buckley (special guest, season 2): L.A. firefighter.
 Angela Bassett as Athena Grant-Nash (special guest, season 3): LAPD patrol sergeant.

Production

Development
On May 12, 2019, it was announced that Fox had given the production a series order for a 9-1-1 spin-off. 9-1-1 creator Ryan Murphy, Brad Falchuk, and Tim Minear would serve as executive producers along with cast member Rob Lowe. Angela Bassett, who starred in the original 9-1-1 serves as an executive producer. Writer John Owen Lowe, son of Rob Lowe, also works on the show.

On April 13, 2020, Fox renewed the series for a second season which premiered on January 18, 2021. On May 17, 2021, Fox renewed the series for a third season which premiered January 3, 2022. On May 16, 2022, Fox renewed the series for a fourth season which premiered on January 24, 2023.

Casting
On May 12, 2019, it was announced that Rob Lowe had been cast in the series as lead role. On September 11, 2019, Liv Tyler was announced to star opposite of Lowe. Jim Parrack joined the cast on September 18, 2019. Two days later, Ronen Rubinstein and Sierra McClain were announced to have joined the cast. On September 23, 2019, Natacha Karam, Brian Michael Smith, Rafael L. Silva, and Julian Works joined the cast.

On September 3, 2020, Gina Torres was cast as a series regular for the second season. On September 22, 2020, Liv Tyler departed the show prior to the second season. Tyler had been commuting between her London home and Los Angeles to film the show and due to potential travel difficulties of the coronavirus pandemic and not wanting to be away from her young children for long.

She asked producers to let her out of her multi-year contract. The possibility of her return was left open. Lisa Edelstein was cast in a recurring role for the second season. On October 8, 2020, Derek Webster joined the cast in a recurring capacity for the second season. On May 25, 2021, Brianna Baker was promoted to series regular for the third season. On September 28, 2022, Neal McDonough, D.B. Woodside, and Amanda Schull joined the cast in recurring capacities for the fourth season.

Filming
Despite being set in Austin, Texas, nearly all filming of the series occurs in Los Angeles, California. The lack of on-location filming in Austin has prompted criticism from the local film industry, claiming that Austin has the production infrastructure to host the series.

Episodes

Series overview

Season 1 (2020)

Season 2 (2021)

Season 3 (2022)

Season 4 (2023)

Reception

Critical response

On Rotten Tomatoes, the series has an approval rating of 77% based on 13 reviews, with an average rating of 7.80/10. The website's critical consensus reads, "If not as outlandishly fun as its predecessor, 9-1-1: Lone Star still packs an entertaining punch and is a great showcase for the handsomely self-aware Rob Lowe." On Metacritic, it has a weighted average score of 69 out of 100, based on reviews from 6 critics, indicating "generally favorable reviews".

Daniel D'Addario of Variety suggests that the series "started from the casting" but that it is not misconceived and is as solid as its predecessor, even if aspects of its conceit are "at times so utopian as to defy belief." He praises the "charismatic and inclusive ensemble" and hopes that the series will make use of them and not focus too much on its lead actor. Daniel Fienberg of The Hollywood Reporter called the series fun and thrilling, stating its succeeds to be a solid franchise companion, "full of explosions, infernos and death-defying stunts, but most of it is delivered in the attempted service of a more complicated series of character studies, an admirable goal not always smoothly executed." Kelly Lawler of USA Today praised the ensemble cast, and said that producers Minear and Falchuck have "clearly tapped into what worked in "9-1-1," transplanted it easily to Texas and found a way to give "Lone Star" a tone and atmosphere all its own." Brian Tallerico of RogerEbert.com wrote: "There's something almost impressively brazen about the way these shows use melodrama, embracing it like old-fashioned soap opera writers." Joel Keller of Decider said " If you loved 9-1-1, you’ll love this show." Keller praised the performances of the actors and the action sequences, complimented the dialogue and the development of the characters.

Amanda Bell of TV Guide rated Lone Star 3.5 out of 5 and stated the series manages to find its own identity without duplicating 9-1-1, called the series inclusive through the diversity of the characters, and said the series celebrates Texas's culture. Melissa Camacho of Common Sense Media rated the series 3 out of 5 stars, complimented the depiction of positive messages and role models, stating the series highlights friendship, teamwork, and community across its characters, while noting the diverse representations.

Sean O'Neal of Texas Monthly criticized the show for its stereotypical portrayal of Texas, and the "baffling" choice of Austin for a conservative Texas setting.

Ratings

Season 1

Season 2

Season 3

Season 4

Accolades

Explanatory notes

References

External links 
 
 

 

2020 American television series debuts
2020s American LGBT-related drama television series
2020s American police procedural television series
2020s American workplace drama television series
9-1-1 (TV series)
American action television series
American television spin-offs
English-language television shows
Fox Broadcasting Company original programming
Gay-related television shows
Television series by 20th Century Fox Television
Television series created by Brad Falchuk
Television series created by Ryan Murphy (writer)
Television shows set in Austin, Texas
Transgender-related television shows